Mendota Township High School is a secondary school located at 2300 W. Main Street, Mendota, Illinois.  It currently educates, as of August 2010, 619 students. The school lies within School District No. 280, and MTHS is the only school that the district operates. The district superintendent is Jeff Prusator who has been serving in that position since 2004. Denise Aughenbaugh is the principal, with Joe Masini serving as vice-principal.

History
Before Mendota High School existed, there were two high schools in the city of Mendota, East Mendota High School and Blackstone High School.  Both were founded in the 1870s.  The two united in 1911 and held classes in Blackstone.  East Mendota then became Lincoln School. In 1917, a new brick high school was constructed in the northern section of town to accommodate a growing student enrollment, and it went through several additions in later years.  That building served the community until 2002, when a new high school was constructed on the northwest side of the city.  The new building was constructed because a restroom on the second floor of the 1917 building collapsed onto the floor below it.  The current high school is located along U.S. Route 52 near the corner of it and N. 44th Road.

Academics 

On the 2010 Prairie State Achievement Exam, 58% of Mendota High School 11th graders met or exceeded standards in Reading.  56% met or exceeded standards in Mathematics, and 50% met or exceeded standards in Science.

Activities

MTHS includes many extra-curricular activities.  Among these are Band, Choir, Drama, Scholastic Bowl, Academic Challenge, FFA, Math Team, Interact Club, Student Council, Spanish Club, Yearbook Club, Spanish National Honor Society, National Honor Society, and several others.

The band has four annual concerts a year: the Fall Concert, Winter Concert, Symphony Concert, and Graduation Concert.

The Mendota drama department puts on dramatic productions, a play every fall, one every summer, and a musical every other spring.

The fine arts department also has a group of madrigal singers.

Band

Sports
The school's teams are known at the Mendota Trojans, and compete in the Big Northern Conference.

List of Athletics

Fall
Golf
Cross Country
Football
Football Cheerleading
Girls' Tennis
Boys' Soccer
Volleyball

Winter
Bowling
Boys' Basketball
Cheerleading
Girls' Basketball
Freshman Girls' Basketball
Freshman Boys' Basketball
Wrestling

Spring
Freshman Baseball
Sophomore Baseball
Varsity Baseball
Girls' Soccer
Sophomore Softball
Varsity Softball
Boys' Tennis
Boys' Track
Girls' Track

Geography

The eight townships fully or partially within the school district are Mendota Township, LaSalle County, Troy Grove Township, LaSalle County, Meriden Township, LaSalle County, Ophir Township, LaSalle County, Waltham Township, LaSalle County, Westfield Township, Bureau County, Clarion Township, Bureau County, Brooklyn Township, Lee County, Sublette Township, Lee County, and Wyoming Township, Lee County. Though the town of Mendota remains at a stable population, the high school population continues to grow. This is possibly due to the amount of small towns encompassed within the boundaries of the district.  Among these are Troy Grove, Triumph, Meriden, Compton, and West Brooklyn.

References

Mendota, Illinois
Public high schools in Illinois
Schools in LaSalle County, Illinois
1911 establishments in Illinois